Andrés Olivas Rubio (born 17 March 1967), is a retired Spanish footballer who played as a forward.

Club career
Andrés Olivas famously scored two goals in the 1997 Chinese Football Super Cup, including a 119th minute golden goal to secure victory against Dalian Wanda.

Career statistics

Club

Notes

References

1967 births
Living people
Spanish footballers
Association football forwards
Levante UD footballers
CD Teruel footballers
AEC Manlleu footballers
Gimnàstic de Tarragona footballers
Beijing Guoan F.C. players
Segunda División B players
Segunda División players
Spanish expatriate footballers
Spanish expatriate sportspeople in China
Expatriate footballers in China